Richard Arvin Overton (May 11, 1906 – December 27, 2018) was an American supercentenarian who at the age of 112 years, 230 days was the oldest verified surviving U.S. World War II veteran and oldest man in the United States. He served in the United States Army. In 2013, he was honored by President Barack Obama. He resided in Austin, Texas, from 1945 until his death in 2018.

Early life and education

Overton was born in Bastrop County, Texas, to Gentry Overton, Sr. and Elizabeth Franklin Overton Waters.

Military and civilian career
Overton enlisted in the United States Army on September 3, 1940, at Fort Sam Houston, Texas.

He served in the South Pacific from 1940 through 1945, including stops in Hawaii, Guam, Palau, and Iwo Jima. He left the U.S. Army in October 1945 as a technician fifth grade.

Overton worked at local furniture stores before taking a position with the Texas Department of the Treasury (now part of the Texas Comptroller of Public Accounts) in Austin. He was married twice but did not have any children.

Later years

Overton gained media attention during the 2013 Memorial Day weekend when he told Fox News he would spend his Memorial Day "smoking cigars and drinking whiskey-stiffened coffee." Overton had been known to smoke about a dozen cigars a day. On that same Memorial Day, Overton met with Texas Governor Rick Perry. Overton was also invited to the White House where he met with President Barack Obama, and to the Veterans Day ceremony at Arlington National Cemetery, where he was singled out by name for praise by the President.

During an NBA game between the San Antonio Spurs and the Memphis Grizzlies on March 24, 2017, Overton was honored during a half-time break.

Overton is the subject of a 2016 documentary, Mr. Overton, in which he is interviewed about his daily routine, thoughts on his longevity, and his military service. On May 3, 2016, he became the oldest surviving American veteran after the death of Frank Levingston.

On May 11, 2016, Overton became a supercentenarian. Following the death of Clarence Matthews (born May 1, 1906) on July 22, 2017, Overton became the oldest living American man. Overton was hospitalized for pneumonia in December 2018. He was placed in a rehabilitation center, where he died on December 27, 2018, aged 112 years and 230 days.

Military awards

Personal life
Overton lived in Austin, Texas. On December 11, 2014, Austin Community College recognized Overton with an honorary associate degree, the college's highest distinction. He was a Member of the Church of Christ and attended church regularly.

On July 1, 2018, it was reported that Overton became a victim of identity theft. A suspect of unknown origin opened a fake banking account with Overton's Social Security number, accessed his personal checking account, and used the money to gather savings bonds. Overton also had a GoFundMe account which raised over $420,000 for his in-home care. On July 5, 2018, Overton's family announced that Bank of America had restored the funds to his account.

See also
List of American supercentenarians
List of the verified oldest people

References

External links

 
 
 

1906 births
2018 deaths
African-American Christians
African-American centenarians
United States Army personnel of World War II
American people of English descent
American supercentenarians
Deaths from pneumonia in Texas
Men supercentenarians
Military personnel from Texas
People from Austin, Texas
People from Bastrop County, Texas
United States Army non-commissioned officers
Identity theft victims
African Americans in World War II
21st-century African-American people